Ranjan Pant is a CEO Advisor, global strategy management consultant and a change management expert.

Pant is an Investment Committee member of a leading top Corporate Private Equity House and an independent director on the Boards of several major companies

He is the son of K. C. Pant, who was an Indian politician and cabinet minister in the federal Government of India holding the portfolios such as Minister of Defence, Finance, Steel and Heavy Engineering, Home Affairs, Electronics, Atomic Energy and Science and Technology. Pant is the grandson of legendary Indian freedom fighter Pandit Govind Ballabh Pant, who along with Mahatma Gandhi and Jawaharlal Nehru was a key figure in the fight for Independence from the British crown.

Early life and education
Ranjan Pant was born in Delhi, India, on 29 June 1959, to K. C. Pant and Ila Pant. He earned a Bachelor in Mechanical Engineering Honors degree from BITS Pilani and an MBA from The Wharton School, University of Pennsylvania.

Professional career 

In early professional life, Pant joined Bain & Co as a Management Consultant and later moved as Director of Corporate Business Development at the General Electric headquarters in Fairfield. After that, he rejoined Bain as a Partner leading the global energy and utilities practice.

Pant is currently an Independent Board Director in leading companies in the energy, mutual funds, textile, information technology and manufacturing sectors. He also served as an Independent Board Director of a Life Insurance company, Retail company, and an Indian Navratna.

Pant has also served as an Executive in Residence at Babson College and is a charter member of TiE.
He has also long been member of the jury panel for K C Mahindra Education Trust scholarships  for post graduate studies for Indian students.

In year 2019, Ranjan was appointed to the Board of Governors  of the Indian Institute of Management Indore (IIM-Indore).

In year 2022, he was appointed on the governing body of Mahindra University

Talks and Insights 
Ranjan has delivered multiple keynote presentations at India Inc. Some of the notable insights below:

[1] "Respect ego in public, but don't in private" - FICCI Innovation Summit, Delhi, 2019

[2] "Learn satisficing instead of satisfying everyone" - Mahindra, Mumbai, 2018

[3] "Fostering High performance through creativity" - School of Inspired Leadership, January 2022, Zoom

References

External links 
  Bloomberg Profile
 List of Notable BITS alumni: Ranjan Pant
 Bain & Co Publications: New utility players – by Ranjan Pant
 Mr Ranjan Pant on: "Singularity - If Yes, So what?" (Talk video)
 Mr Ranjan Pant on Tech Enabled English Language Learning 
 59 students awarded 2017 K.C. Mahindra Scholarships for Post Graduate Studies Abroad, 2017
 Conversation with Ranjan Pant, CEO Advisor, Global Strategy Consultant | Conversations That Count, School of Inspired Leadership

1959 births
Living people
Birla Institute of Technology and Science, Pilani alumni
Indian management consultants
People from Delhi
Wharton School of the University of Pennsylvania alumni